The count of the Electoral College ballots during a joint session of the 115th United States Congress, pursuant to the Electoral Count Act, on January 6, 2017, was the final step to confirm then-President-elect Donald Trump's victory in the 2016 presidential election over Hillary Clinton.

This event was notable due to the many faithless electors in the electoral college votes, and the many unsuccessful objections raised by Democratic members of the United States House of Representatives.

Background 
The United States Electoral College is the group of presidential electors required by the Constitution to form every four years for the sole purpose of electing the president and vice president. Each state appoints electors according to its legislature, equal in number to its congressional delegation (senators and representatives). Federal office holders cannot be electors. Of the current 538 electors, an absolute majority of 270 or more electoral votes is required to elect the president and vice president. If no candidate achieves an absolute majority there, a contingent election is held by the United States House of Representatives to elect the president, and by the United States Senate to elect the vice president.

Each state and the District of Columbia produces two documents to be forwarded to Congress, a certificate of ascertainment and a certificate of vote. A certificate of ascertainment is an official document that identifies the state's appointed College electors and the tally of the final popular vote count for each candidate in that state in a presidential election; the certificate of ascertainment is submitted after an election by the governor of each state to the archivist of the United States and others, in accordance with 3 U.S.C. §§ 6–14 and the Electoral Count Act. Within the United States' electoral system, the certificates "[represent] a crucial link between the popular vote and votes cast by electors". The certificates must bear the state seal and the governor's signature. Staff from the Office of the Federal Register ensure that each certificate contains all legally required information. When each state's appointed electors meet to vote (on the first Monday after the second Wednesday of December), they sign and record their vote on a certificate of vote, which are then paired with the certificate of ascertainment, which together are sent to be opened and counted by congress.

The 12th Amendment mandates Congress assemble in joint session to count the electoral votes and declare the winners of the election. The Electoral Count Act, a federal law passed in 1887, further established specific procedures for the counting of the electoral votes by the joint Congress. The session is ordinarily required to take place on January 6 in the calendar year immediately following the meetings of the presidential electors. Since the 20th Amendment, the newly elected joint Congress declares the winner of the election; all elections before 1936 were determined by the outgoing Congress.

A state's certificate of vote can be rejected only if both Houses of Congress, debating separately, vote to accept an objection by a majority in each House. If the objection is approved by both Houses, the state's votes are not included in the count. Individual votes can also be objected to, and are also not counted. If there are no objections or all objections are overruled, the presiding officer simply includes a state's votes, as declared in the certificate of vote, in the official tally. After the certificates from all states are read and the respective votes are counted, the presiding officer simply announces the final state of the vote. This announcement concludes the joint session and formalizes the recognition of the president-elect and of the vice president-elect. The senators then depart from the House chamber. The final tally is printed in the Senate and House journals.

Joint Session of Congress 
A total of 10 state certificates were objected to by Democratic members of congress, all of which were to states won by Donald Trump. Objections to the votes needed to be in writing and signed by both a member of the House and a member of the Senate. Every House member who rose to object did so without a senator's signature. Many of the objections were raised due to disputed claims of voter suppression and foreign interference. Then-Vice President Joe Biden presided over the count. Senators Amy Klobuchar and Roy Blunt were the tellers from the Senate, and Congressmen Gregg Harper and Bob Brady were the tellers from the House.

At 1:09 PM, Congressman Jim McGovern raised the first objection, objecting the certification of Alabama's electors. Biden dismissed the objection because it lacked the signature of a senator. Shortly after, members Jamie Raskin and Pramila Jayapal objected to electors from Florida and Georgia, respectively. After Barbara Lee objected to Michigan's electors, her microphone was turned off. Lee later objected to West Virginia's electors. Congresswoman Sheila Jackson Lee made a total of four objections, objecting the certification of Mississippi's, North Carolina's (in which Raul Grijalva also objected), South Carolina's, and Wisconsin's electors. Each time an objection was raised, Biden noted that the objections could not be entertained due to the lack of a signature from a senator. During Wyoming's certification, which was the final state to be certified, Maxine Waters pleaded to the chamber, asking for a senator to sign her objection. No senator came forward, and the procedure finished at 1:41 PM, with a total of 304 certified electoral college votes for Donald Trump and 227 certified electoral college votes for Hillary Clinton.

*Maine awards electors by congressional district. Clinton won Maine at-large and Maine's first congressional district, while Trump won the second district.

See also 
 Presidential transition of Donald Trump

Notes

References 

2016 United States presidential election
United States Electoral College
United States election controversies
Vote counting